Washington Township is one of the fourteen townships of Holmes County, Ohio, United States. As of the 2010 census the population was 1,624, of whom 1,438 lived in the unincorporated portion of the township.

Geography
Located in the northwestern corner of the county, it borders the following townships:
Lake Township, Ashland County - north
Clinton Township, Wayne County - northeast
Ripley Township - east
Knox Township - south
Hanover Township, Ashland County - southwest
Green Township, Ashland County - northwest

Several populated places are located in Washington Township:
Part of the village of Loudonville, in the west
Part of the village of Nashville, in the southeast
The unincorporated community of Lakeville, in the northeast

Name and history
It is one of forty-three Washington Townships statewide.

Government
The township is governed by a three-member board of trustees, who are elected in November of odd-numbered years to a four-year term beginning on the following January 1. Two are elected in the year after the presidential election and one is elected in the year before it. There is also an elected township fiscal officer, who serves a four-year term beginning on April 1 of the year after the election, which is held in November of the year before the presidential election. Vacancies in the fiscal officership or on the board of trustees are filled by the remaining trustees.

References

External links
County website

Townships in Holmes County, Ohio
Townships in Ohio